Joe Gans (born Joseph Gant; November 25, 1874 – August 10, 1910) was an American professional boxer. Gans was rated the greatest lightweight boxer of all-time by boxing historian and Ring Magazine founder, Nat Fleischer. Known as the "Old Master", he became the first African-American world boxing champion of the 20th century, reigning continuously as world lightweight champion from 1902–1908, defending the title 15 times versus 13 boxers. He was inducted into the International Boxing Hall of Fame in 1990.

Career

Gans started boxing professionally in early 1891. Starting in Baltimore, he gained many fans within the boxing world, both white and black alike, with his "scientific" approach to fighting.

Unlike the more brutish and adrenaline-fueled fighting styles more prevalent in the time, Gans’ fighting method involved learning an opponent's strengths and weaknesses to compete with a game plan. He fought through much adversity and unfair stipulations for certain fights. On three separate occasions in 1895, he had to fight an extra round after going the distance. In a fight versus Johnny Van Heest, "Gans had Van Heese whipped to a standstill in the eighth round, but Mr. Daniel Carr, the referee, ordered an extra round. Though Van Heese had none the best of the last round, he was given the decision. Against Bobby Dobbs, "Gans had to stop Dobbs in 10 rounds or get the loser's end of the purse (25 percent) and also had to pay Dobbs $50 for every round after 10th that the latter was able to stay. Dobbs asked his seconds to throw up the sponge in the middle of the 14th round, claiming a sore hand.
Dobbs was down repeatedly, either from knock-downs or going down on his own. In the fight with Buddy King in 1903, they fought in the drizzling rain

A slender man, never weighing over 137 pounds, Gans frequently fought heavier boxers, thus adding to the legend of his scientific fighting technique. He became known as a true student of the sport, earning him the nickname “Old Master.”

Two fights in one day
On January 7, 1895, after knocking out Samuel Allen in three rounds, Allen's second, Bud Brown, immediately challenged to fight Gans. Not backing down from a fight, Gans accepted and outpointed Brown in a 10 round points decision.

Title bouts
On March 3, 1900, at the Broadway Athletic Club in New York, Gans quit with an eye injury in the twelfth round and lost via TKO while challenging lightweight champion Frank Erne in Gans' first title fight.

However, in their rematch two years later at International A.C., Fort Erie, Canada, Gans knocked Erne out in one round to convincingly take the world lightweight title. ""In the exchange, Gans got both hands to head, and Erne seemed a trifle dazed. Gans felt him out with a left shove to the face, drawing blood to nose. Erne seemed dazed, and Gans rushed and exchanged, putting right plump on Erne's jaw. Erne fell slowly to the floor with his mouth and nose bleeding, rolled over on his stomach, and was counted out before he could attempt to regain his feet." (wire report)" Gans had thus become the first-ever African-American boxing champion; he had also become the first black title holder since the Canadian born, George Dixon won the bantamweight world title in 1892  and the island-born Barbados Joe Walcott won the World Welterweight title on December 18, 1901. Gans reigned as champion from 1902 to 1908.

On January 6, 1902, Gans defeated the former World Welterweight Champion Canadian born Eddie Connolly. Connolly lost in a five-round bout at the Washington Sports Club in Philadelphia.

One reporter noted that Connolly "did nothing but hug and wrestle, adding variety to his performance in the third by deliberately trying to butt the Baltimorean (Gans)." The reporter also noted that Connolly clinched frequently and "wrestled" rather than boxed, probably to protect himself from the fierce assaults of Gans. By the time the referee ended the bout in the fifth, Connolly had been "rendered practically helpless" by the powerful punching of Gans.

Gans also defended his Lightweight World Title against other talented boxers such as Steve Crosby and Gus Gardiner. There was also Charley Sieger, Kid McPartland, Rufe Turner, Charles "Elbows" McFadden, and Frank Erne.

In an important title defense, he defeated the "Durable Dane" Oscar "Battling" Nelson in 42 rounds on September 3, 1906, in Goldfield, Nevada. This blockbuster fight, arranged by legendary promoter Tex Rickard, would eventually be honored with a historic memorial.

On September 15, 1905, Gans fought to a 15 round pre-arranged draw with future Welterweight World Championship claimant Mike "Twin" Sullivan. Most people reporting on the fights believed that Sullivan deserved the decision. In an immediate rematch, he defeated Sullivan by knockout on January 19 and March 17, 1906, in San Francisco and Los Angeles and again in March of the same year.

Although recorded as a Welterweight Title match and the bout supposedly had a weight limit set at around 142 pounds (which was estimated to be Sullivan's weigh-in), Gans' weigh-in was estimated to have been seven or eight pounds lighter. Gans' defeat of the heavier Sullivan, a strong puncher by reputation, showed his mastery in the ring. In this well-attended bout, Gans share of the gate was a considerable $2,425.20, and Sullivan's was $1,616.80. Gans reportedly had bet another $1,700 on himself, which, if accurate, made his earnings on the fight quite considerable.

Gans and Battling Nelson fought for the World Lightweight title twice in Colma, California: first on July 4 and September 9 of 1908. Gans lost the first fight by KO in the 17th round of 45, ending his multi-year reign, and subsequently lost the immediate rematch via KO in the 21st round of 45.

Draw with Barbados Joe Walcott
On September 30, 1904, Gans fought to a 20 round draw against Barbados Joe Walcott. "The San Francisco Chronicle reported that Walcott damaged ligaments in his left arm and that it was "useless from the 4th round on". It was announced before the fight that no title was at stake. Referee Jack Welch gave 7 rounds to Gans, 5 to Walcott, with 8 even, but thought that Walcott's aggressiveness compensated Gans' advantage in cleverness. Shortly after this fight Walcott accidentally shot himself in the hand and was out of action until January 1906."

Death
Joe Gans died on August 10, 1910 of tuberculosis, at the age of 35. He is buried in Mount Auburn Cemetery (Baltimore, Maryland) in Baltimore. His monument is maintained by the International Boxing Commission and sits just to the left of the main entrance of the cemetery.

It reads: "I was born in the city of Baltimore in the year 1874, and it might be well to state at this time that my right name is Joseph Gant, not Gans. However, when I became an object of newspaper publicity, some reporter made a mistake and my name appeared as Joe Gans, and as Joe Gans it remained ever since."

Professional honors and legacy

Gans had a final professional record of 145 wins with 100 knockouts, 10 losses, 16 draws, 6 no contests and 19 no decisions (Newspaper Decisions: 13-2-4). He was inducted into the International Boxing Hall of Fame in 1990.

A bronze statue of Joe Gans stands in the suite floor at Madison Square Garden but was previously outside of the locker rooms. Modern day boxers would traditionally bump the statue's outstretched left fist for good-luck before matches.

Gans’ legendary fight on September 3, 1906 with Battling Nelson was commemorated with a memorial located in Goldfield, Nevada at the site of the fight.

Gans was the first African-American to win a World Boxing Championship and the first to win a Lightweight Boxing title. Gans' achievements not only set new records, but gave African Americans hope in the early twentieth century. In a time of racial segregation, champion Joe Gans somehow emerged victorious.

Gans was rated the greatest Lightweight boxer of all-time by boxing historian and Ring Magazine founder, Nat Fleischer.

One boxing historian writes about Gans saying: "through his ring accomplishments, Gans put into action what others could only theorize. The articulation of the black quest for social equality reached large audiences through the pulpits, and the most authoritative sermons were published in newspapers and religious quarterlies".

Motion picture

The Gans-Nelson battle in Colma, California was the subject of a four-reel motion picture that played in major cities around the country.

Hemingway connection
Ernest Hemingway utilized Joe Gans as a character in his 1916 short story 'A Matter of Colour'. This early story set the stage for Hemingway's famous 1927 parable 'The Killers'.

Professional boxing record
All information in this section is derived from BoxRec, unless otherwise stated.

Official record

All newspaper decisions are officially regarded as “no decision” bouts and are not counted in the win/loss/draw column.

Unofficial record

Record with the inclusion of newspaper decisions in the win/loss/draw column.

Sports achievements

See also
Lineal championship

References

Further reading

 Miles, J.H., Davis, J.J., Ferguson-Roberts, S.E., and Giles, R.G. (2001). Almanac of African American Heritage. Paramus, NJ: Prentice Hall Press.
 Potter, J. (2002). African American Firsts. New York, NY: Kensington Publishing Corp.
 Aycock, Colleen and Mark Scott (2008), Joe Gans: A Biography of the First African American World Boxing Champion. Jefferson, NC: McFarland & Co.
 The Longest Fight: In the Ring with Joe Gans, Boxing’s First African-American Champion. By William Gildea. Farrar, Straus & Giroux; 256 pages

External links

 
 
Analyzing the Subtle Sophistication of Joe Gans
Nelson Whips Gans in the Seventeenth: Veteran Colored Champion Shows His Cleverness in the Early Rounds- Special to The New York Times

1874 births
1910 deaths
African-American boxers
American male boxers
Burials at Mount Auburn Cemetery (Baltimore, Maryland)
International Boxing Hall of Fame inductees
Lightweight boxers
Boxers from Baltimore
20th-century African-American people